John Green (born 1977) is an American author, YouTube content creator and podcaster.

John or Johnny Green may also refer to:

Arts
John Green (painter) (died 1802), American-born Bermudian painter
Johnny Green (1908–1989), American composer and inductee of the Songwriters Hall of Fame
John Willison Green (1927–2016), Canadian journalist and prominent "Bigfoot" researcher
John M. Green (born 1953), Australian author and publisher
Johnny Green (director) (born 1967), English director of commercials and short films
John Green (producer), American TV producer for ABC News

Military
John Green (Medal of Honor) (1825–1908), German-born American soldier and recipient of the Medal of Honor
Sir John Green (Royal Navy officer) (1866–1948), British admiral
John Leslie Green (1888–1916), English Victoria Cross recipient
John Francis Green (1946–1975), Irish Provisional Irish Republican Army member
John Green (priest) (born 1953), British Chaplain of the Fleet and Director General, Naval Chaplaincy Service

Politics and public service
John Green (speaker) (1400–1473), Speaker of the House of Commons of England
John W. Green (1781–1834), American judge and Supreme Court of Virginia justice
John Green (judge) (1807–1887), American judge and Indiana state senator
John Green (Wisconsin politician) (fl 1867), American military officer and Wisconsin state assemblyman
John Patterson Green (1845–1940), American attorney, politician, public servant and writer
John Greene (Kilkenny MP) (died 1883), Irish Member of Parliament in the British House of Commons, sometimes referred to as John Green
John Aloysius Green (1844–1920), American mine owner and Iowa state senator
John Green (Australian politician) (born 1945), Tasmanian politician
John Green (Idaho politician) (born 1959), American politician, attorney, and former peace officer from Idaho

Sports

American football
John Green (defensive end) (1921–1989), American football player for the Philadelphia Eagles of the NFL
John Green (guard) (1924–1981), American football player and coach, College Football Hall of Fame inductee
Johnny Green (gridiron football) (1937–2019), American collegiate and professional football quarterback

Association football (soccer)
John Green (footballer, born 1894) (1894–1966), English footballer
John Green (footballer, born 1896) (1896–1927), English footballer
John Green (footballer, born 1939) (1939–2010), English football midfielder for Tranmere, Blackpool, Port Vale and Vancouver Royals
John Green (footballer, born 1958) (born 1958), English football defender for Rotherham, Scunthorpe and Darlington

Cricket
John Green (Middlesex cricketer) (1896–1960), English cricketer
John Green (Warwickshire cricketer) (1908–1987), English cricketer
John Green (Trinidadian cricketer) (1918–?), Trinidadian cricketer

Other sports
John Green (rugby union) (1881–1968), England rugby union international
John Green (Australian footballer) (1885–1949), Australian rules footballer
Johnny Green (basketball) (born 1933), American basketball player

Other people
John Henry Green (1636–1685), English physician and philanthropist
John Green (bishop) (1706–1779), British clergyman and academic
John Green (1787–1852), English architect and one half of the father-and-son architectural team
John Cleve Green (1800–1875), China merchant
John Richard Green (1837–1883), English historian
John Green (agriculturalist) (1862–1953), British agriculturalist
John Green (educationalist) (1867–1922), British educationalist and professor of education
John Frederick Norman Green (1873–1949), English geologist
John Green (unionist) (1896–1957), Scottish-born American labor union leader
John Green (botanist) (born 1930), Australian botanist
John S. A. Green (1931–2012), British meteorologist
John Green (headmaster) (born 1967), British rugby player and schoolmaster
John C. Green, American academic and director of the Ray C. Bliss Institute of Applied Politics
John Green (sociologist), American sociologist

Other
"John Deere Green", a song from the 1993 album Honky Tonk Attitude by American country-music singer Joe Diffie

See also

Jack Green (disambiguation)
John Greene (disambiguation)
Jon Green (born 1985), rugby league player
Jonathan Green (disambiguation)
John Greer (disambiguation)